Ḥubaysh ibn Dulja al-Qaynī (died 684) was a tribal leader of the Quda'a in Jund al-Urdunn (district of Jordan) and a commander for the Umayyad caliphs Mu'awiya I, Yazid I and Marwan I.

Life
Hubaysh was the son of Dulja ibn Mushammit, an Arab chieftain of the Quda'a tribal confederation present in Syria and northwestern Arabia. Dulja is recorded to have visited the Islamic prophet Muhammad (d. 632) and took up residence in Syria's Jund al-Urdunn (military district of Jordan). According to his nisba (descriptive suffix), Hubaysh belonged to the Balqayn tribe, which formed part of the Quda'a confederation. Hubaysh's eldest son was Abd al-Rahman, hence his kunya 'Abu Abd al-Rahman'.

Hubaysh commanded the Jordanian Quda'a contingent of Mu'awiya ibn Abi Sufyan in the Battle of Siffin in 657 against the forces of Caliph Ali. In the winters of 667/68 and 668/69, during the reign of Mu'awiya, he commanded or participated in raiding in the vicinity of Antioch. Under Mu'awiya's son and successor Yazid I, Hubaysh led a 1,000-strong contingent of soldiers from Jordan in the army of Muslim ibn Uqba against the inhabitants of Medina at the Battle of al-Harra in 683. The army withdrew to Syria in the wake of Yazid's death, but Hubaysh was later dispatched by Caliph Marwan I at the head of an army against the forces of the anti-Umayyad caliph Abd Allah ibn al-Zubayr in 684. In the ensuing Battle of al-Rabadha to the east of Medina, Hubaysh was slain by a Persian archer Yazid ibn Siyah al-Uswari in the army of the Zubayrid governor of Basra al-Harith ibn Abd Allah al-Makhzumi. Most of the Umayyad force was killed, though among the survivors was the future viceroy of Iraq, al-Hajjaj ibn Yusuf.

Nothing is heard of Hubaysh's family until 743, when his grandsons Hakam ibn Jurw and Rashid ibn Jurw led the tribes of Jordan under Muhammad ibn Abd al-Malik, son of Caliph Abd al-Malik, in revolt against Caliph Yazid III. It was suppressed by the Umayyad prince and general Sulayman ibn Hisham.

References

Bibliography

684 deaths
7th-century Arabs
Generals of the Umayyad Caliphate
Military personnel killed in action
People of the First Fitna
People of the Second Fitna
Quda'a